The 2011–12 Barangay Ginebra Kings season was the 33rd season of the franchise in the Philippine Basketball Association (PBA).

Key dates
August 28: The 2011 PBA draft took place in Robinson's Place Ermita, Manila.

Draft picks

Roster

Philippine Cup

Eliminations

Standings

Bracket

Quarterfinals

Barangay Ginebra-Rain or Shine series

Commissioner's Cup

Eliminations

Standings

Seeding playoffs

Bracket

Semifinals

Barangay Ginebra–B-Meg series

Governors' Cup

Eliminations

Standings

Semifinals

Standings

Finals berth playoff

Transactions

Trades

Philippine Cup

Additions

Subtractions

Recruited imports

References

Barangay Ginebra San Miguel seasons
Barangay